Burlington Northern Depot or Burlington Northern Station may refer to:

Any one of many former train stations on the Burlington Northern Railroad, including:

in the United States (by state then city)
Sandpoint Burlington Northern Railway Station, Sandpoint, Idaho, listed on the NRHP in Bonner County, Idaho
Burlington Northern Depot (Detroit Lakes, Minnesota), listed on the National Register of Historic Places listings in Becker County, Minnesota
Burlington Northern Depot (Beatrice, Nebraska), listed on the National Register of Historic Places in Gage County, Nebraska
Burlington Northern Depot (Amenia, North Dakota), listed on the National Register of Historic Places in Cass County, North Dakota
Burlington Northern Depot (Chehalis, Washington), listed on the National Register of Historic Places in Lewis County, Washington

See also
Burlington Station (disambiguation)
Burlington Cedar Rapids and Northern Depot (disambiguation)